Christopher Sebastian Lubanski (born March 24, 1985) was a professional baseball player from 2003 to 2011. He was selected by the Kansas City Royals as the 5th overall in the 2003 MLB Draft. In 2003, he was selected as the Gatorade High School Baseball National Player of the Year. He is a 2003 graduate of Kennedy-Kenrick Catholic High School in Norristown, Pennsylvania.

References

External links

1985 births
Living people
Baseball players from Pennsylvania
People from Lansdale, Pennsylvania
Baseball pitchers
Burlington Bees players
Kane County Cougars players
High Desert Mavericks players
Wichita Wranglers players
Omaha Royals players
Las Vegas 51s players
Reading Phillies players
Arizona League Royals players
Chico Outlaws players